The 14th Asian Athletics Championships were held in Colombo, Sri Lanka on 9–12 August 2002.

Results

Men

Women

Medal table

See also
2002 in athletics (track and field)

References
Medalists at GBR Athletics
Full results

 
Asian Athletics Championships
Asian Championships
Athletics
International athletics competitions hosted by Sri Lanka
Sport in Colombo
2002 in Asian sport
August 2002 sports events in Asia